Voskresenskoye is a rural locality (a village) in Sosnovskoye Rural Settlement, Vologodsky District, Vologda Oblast, Russia. The population was 3 as of 2002.

Geography 
The distance to Vologda is 34.5 km, to Sosnovka is 15 km. Bokovo, Novoye, Levino are the nearest rural localities.

References 

Rural localities in Vologodsky District